Beelzebub (Baʿal-zəḇūḇ), also spelled Beelzebul or  Belzebuth, is a name derived from a Philistine god, formerly worshipped in Ekron, and later adopted by some Abrahamic religions as a major demon. The name Beelzebub is associated with the Canaanite god Baal.

In theological sources, predominantly Christian, Beelzebub is another name for Satan. He is known in demonology as one of the seven deadly demons or seven princes of Hell, Beelzebub representing gluttony and envy. The Dictionnaire Infernal describes Beelzebub as a being capable of flying, known as the "Lord of the Flyers", or the "Lord of the Flies".

Hebrew Scriptures
The source for the name Beelzebub is in the Books of Kings, written Ba'al-zəbûb, referring to a deity worshipped by the Philistines. The title Baal, meaning "Lord" in Ugaritic, was used in conjunction with a descriptive name of a specific god. Opinions differ on what the name means.

In one understanding, Ba'al-zəbûb is translated literally as "lord of (the) flies". It was long ago suggested that there was a relationship between the Philistine god, and cults of flies—referring to a view of them as pests, feasting on excrement—appearing in the Hellenic world, such as Zeus Apomyios or Myiagros. This is confirmed by the Ugaritic text which depicts Ba'al expelling flies, which are the cause of a person's sickness.

Alternatively, the deity's actual name could have been Ba'al-zəbûl, "lord of the (heavenly) dwelling", and Ba'al-zebub could have been a derogatory pun used by the Israelites.

The Septuagint renders the name as Baalzebub and as Baal muian ("Baal of flies"). However, Symmachus may have reflected a tradition of its offensive ancient name when he rendered it as Beelzeboul.

Testament of Solomon
In the Testament of Solomon, Beelzebul (not Beelzebub) appears as prince of the demons and says that he was formerly a leading heavenly angel who was associated with the star Hesperus (the normal Greek name for the planet Venus (Aphrodite, Αφροδíτη) as evening star). Seemingly, Beelzebul here is synonymous with Lucifer. Beelzebul claims to cause destruction through tyrants, to cause demons to be worshipped among men, to excite priests to lust, to cause jealousies in cities and murders, and to bring about war. The Testament of Solomon is an Old Testament pseudepigraphical work, purportedly written by King Solomon, in which the author mostly describes particular demons whom he enslaved to help build Solomon's Temple, with substantial Christian interpolations.

Christian Bible

In Mark 3:22, the scribes accuse Jesus Christ of driving out demons by the power of Beelzebul, the prince of demons. The name also appears in the expanded version in Matthew 12:24,27 and Luke 11:15, 18–19, as well as in Matthew 10:25.

It is unknown whether Symmachus the Ebionite was correct in identifying these names.

In any case, the form Beelzebub was substituted for Beelzeboul in the Syriac translation and Latin Vulgate translation of the gospels, and this substitution was repeated in the King James Version, the resulting form Beelzeboul being mostly unknown to Western European and descendant cultures until some more recent translations restored it.

Beelzebub is also identified in the New Testament as the Devil, "the prince of demons". Biblical scholar Thomas Kelly Cheyne suggested that it might be a derogatory corruption of Ba'al-zəbûl, "Lord of the High Place" (i.e., Heaven) or "High Lord".

In Arabic translations, the name is rendered as Baʿl-zabūl.

Gnostic tradition
Texts of the Gospel of Nicodemus vary; Beelzebul and Beelzebub are used interchangeably. The name is used by Hades as a secondary name for the Devil, but it may vary with each translation of the text; other versions separate Beelzebub from the Devil.

According to the teachings of the Modern Gnostic Movement of Samael Aun Weor, Beelzebub was a prince of demons who rebelled against the Black Lodge during World War II and was converted by Aun Weor to the White Lodge.

Christian tradition

Beelzebub is commonly described as placed high in Hell's hierarchy. According to the stories of the 16th-century occultist Johann Weyer, Beelzebub led a successful revolt against the Devil, is the chief lieutenant of Lucifer, the Emperor of Hell, and presides over the Order of the Fly. Similarly, the 17th-century exorcist Sébastien Michaëlis, in his Admirable History (1612), placed Beelzebub among the three most prominent fallen angels, the other two being Lucifer and Leviathan. John Milton, in his epic poem Paradise Lost, first published in 1667, identified an unholy trinity consisting of Beelzebub, Lucifer, and Astaroth, with Beelzebub as the second-ranking of the many fallen angels. Milton wrote of Beelzebub "than whom, Satan except, none higher sat." Beelzebub is also a character in John Bunyan's The Pilgrim's Progress, first published in 1678.

Sebastien Michaelis associated Beelzebub with the deadly sin of pride. However, according to Peter Binsfeld, Beelzebub was the demon of gluttony, one of the other seven deadly sins, whereas Francis Barrett asserted that Beelzebub was the prince of idolatry.

Within religious circles, the accusation of demon possession has been used as both an insult and an attempt to categorize unexplained behavior, such as schizophrenia. Not only had the Pharisees disparagingly accused Jesus of using Beelzebub's demonic powers to heal people (Luke 11:14–26), but others have been labeled possessed for acts of an extreme nature. Down through history, Beelzebub has been held responsible for many cases of demonic possession, such as that of Sister Madeleine de Demandolx de la Palud, Aix-en-Provence in 1611, whose relationship with Father Jean-Baptiste Gaufridi led not only to countless traumatic events at the hands of her inquisitors but also to the torture and execution of that "bewitcher of young nuns", Gaufridi himself. Beelzebub was also imagined to be sowing his influence in Salem, Massachusetts; his name came up repeatedly during the Salem witch trials, the last large-scale public expression of witch hysteria in either North America or Europe, and afterwards, the Rev. Cotton Mather wrote a pamphlet titled Of Beelzebub and his Plot.

Judaism

Elijah the Prophet then condemns Ahaziah to die by God's words because Ahaziah sought counsel from Ba'al-zebûb rather than from God.

Rabbinical literature commentary equates Baal-zebub of Ekron as lord of the "fly". The word Ba'al-zebûb in rabbinical texts is a mockery of the Ba'al religion, which ancient Hebrews considered to be idol worship.

Jewish scholars have interpreted the title of "Lord of the Flies" as the Hebrew way of calling Ba'al a pile of excrement, and comparing Ba'al followers to flies.

See also
 Bael (demon)
 Baphomet
 Belial
 Harrowing of Hell
 Lord of the Flies

References

External links
 Catholic Encyclopedia: Beelzebub
 Jewish Encyclopedia: Beelzebub

 
Christian terminology
Deities in the Hebrew Bible
Satan
Testament of Solomon
Demons in the Old Testament apocrypha
Baal
Books of Kings
Gospel of Matthew
Gospel of Luke
Lucifer
Devils
Ekron